"My Way or the Highway to Heaven" is the 642nd episode of the American animated television series The Simpsons and the third episode of season 30.

Plot
In heaven, in apparent homage to the show's traditional opening segment’s couch gags, God and St. Peter sit on the couch discussing possibly relaxing their admissions requirements to address the perceived lack of people there after a recent building project. They look on as Ned Flanders leads a Sunday school class: “Who will get into heaven”. In a montage, to the soundtrack of Ted Moock's cover of “Cheek to Cheek” with its lyric “I'm in heaven”, the children are seen imagining how they die and ascend, with Bart Simpson’s vision including his deathbed conversion repentance. Ned tells them the only way to heaven is to “never stray from the path of righteousness” and, after goading from Nelson Muntz, recalls his non-religious, bebop upbringing as Neddy to beatnik parents, and his subsequent trail of “depraved” jobs until he started doing door-to-door sales.

As a salesman of Vertebreaker Trampolines, Ned is initially discouraged, but then the 1971 televised moonwalks of Apollo 14 astronauts “bouncing” on the moon increases sales. He revels in his success, including a promotional billboard stating “Ned Flanders, Your Key To Getting High”, until another salesman tells him that the trampolines are death traps, where a static charge is built up with each bounce, then released en masse on the 500th bounce, killing the child. Ned vows to save a then-young Homer Simpson, who the Springfield Shopper reports intends to surpass the “500-bounce barrier” and enter into the Duff Book of World Records (a reference to Guinness World Records). Ned rushes to intervene, pushes Homer out of the way, and is electrocuted by the trampoline and a bolt of lightning that was attracted by it, appearing in heaven before a hippie-stylized, Che Guevara poster-donning Jesus who offers him the chance to live again if he becomes a Christian. He wakes up “reborn” in his hospital bed with “a sign of [God's] mercy”, a permanent scar which is hidden by his mustache.

Back in heaven on the couch, St. Peter suggests God consider another potential pool of candidates: atheists, who do not believe in God but might still be righteous. Back in the Sunday school class, Marge Simpson tells a story of her atheist grandmother, Genevieve Bouvier, who she claimed lived in Nazi-occupied France in 1944 during World War II; however, the caption reveals her grandmother was actually living in Nazi-aligned Vichy, France in 1944. She co-managed Cafe Meaux with the cafe's namesake, her husband Meaux, a Nazi-collaborator. While Meaux bootlicks a Nazi commandant and his entourage of officers, Genevieve goes down to the expansive cellar to prepare dinner for the officers. There she discovers some U.S. paratroopers (the younger versions of Abe Simpson's father and the fathers of Sideshow Mel, Lenny Leonard, Carl Carlson and Barney Gumble, whom she disguises as dining staff. During the meal, one of the U.S. soldiers mistakenly reveals the plan for Normandy landings. To stop the Nazis from warning others, the U.S. soldiers sing “La Marseillaise”, which prompts the cafe patrons to stand and join in blocking the Nazis' exit. When the Nazi general attempts to kidnap Genevieve, she kills him, and Meuax and the paratroopers help her in the killing of the Nazis. After the massacre the paratroopers escape and Genevieve and Meuax reconcile, thus proving Marge's point that atheists can also do great things. Back in heaven God agrees to opening heaven to atheists.

In heaven still, God and St. Peter are visited by Buddha who encourages them to open heaven to other faiths. In the Sunday school class, Lisa Simpson tells the class that besides redemption, and good works, there is the Way of enlightenment. She shares a story she calls “The Princess not affiliated with Disney, unless we are now owned by Disney”. In Lumbini, Shakya Republic of Nepal during the 6th century BC, a spoiled princess Siddmartha (a feminized version of Siddhārtha Gautama, founder of Buddhism) remained dissatisfied despite being denied nothing. She sought a middle path between opulence and decadence, and ventured out of the palace disguised as a poor boy. In search of scholars she goes to Kathmandu U. but frustratingly finds the university a party school; being void of ideas, she opts instead to sit under the Bodhi Tree until she was enlightened. Back in heaven, God agrees that “all the good souls are welcome”.

Heaven is instantly crowded again including a shocked Mr. Burns, who was let in as Waylon Smithers' guest as a plus-one invitee. Burns demands to get in later under his own merit, and Smithers goes after him. Back on Earth, Flanders tells his sons Rod and Todd that thunder is angels bowling; St. Peter then accidentally drops a tenpin on their house, which they consider a blessing.

Reception
Dennis Perkins of The A.V. Club gave the episode a B− stating, "The episode takes the form of a sort of religion-based Treehouse of Horror, with three stories (told by Ned, Marge, and Lisa, respectively) that test out the new criteria by which God will choose who deserves to hang out for all eternity in the show's traditionally cloudy and harp-strewn paradise. Written by marrieds Dan Castellaneta and Deb Lacusta, along with first-time Simpsons writer Vince Waldron, the result is a decidedly low-stakes outing that, nonetheless, isn't without its charms."

Tony Sokol of Den of Geek gave the episode 4.5 out of 5 points ranking stating, "The Simpsons may not preach against evolution, but they have evolved from the kind of show that was uproariously laugh out loud to evoking us to say, oh, clever. The series will always be a little intellectual, as it is a constant battle between the selfless wisdom of Marge and Lisa and the chaotic buffoonery of Bart and Homer. Where were Bart and Homer, by the way? We get a story from Ned in place of a family member? Could it be it wouldn't matter what they brought as an offering it would send the whole town of Springfield straight to hell? "My Way or the Highway to Heaven" should have let the boy and his Homer offer their own dark alternative. The episode is tinted too bright."

"My Way or the Highway to Heaven" scored a 1.0 rating with a 5 share and was watched by 2.51 million people, making The Simpsons Fox's highest rated show of the night.

References

External links
 

The Simpsons (season 30) episodes
2018 American television episodes
Atheism in television
Portrayals of Jesus on television
Television episodes about religion
Television episodes about Buddhism
Bob's Burgers
Television episodes set in France
Television episodes about Nazis
Fiction about God